Hotel by a Railroad is a painting completed in 1952 by the American realist painter and printmaker Edward Hopper. It resides in the collection of the Hirshhorn Museum and Sculpture Garden. The work is an oil on canvas, measuring 101.981 x 79.375 cm.

References 

1952 paintings
Paintings by Edward Hopper
Collection of the Smithsonian Institution